Grevillea oligomera is a species of flowering plant in the family Proteaceae and is endemic to inland areas of Western Australia. It is an erect shrub with sometimes-divided leaves, the leaves or lobes linear, and reddish-pink and blue-grey flowers with a reddish-pink style.

Description

Taxonomy
In 1994, Peter M. Olde and Neil R. Marriott raised the subspecies to species status as G. oligomera in The Grevillea Book. The specific epithet (oligomera) means "few parts", in this case, the leaf lobes.

Distribution and habitatGrevillea oligomera'' grows in shrubland on sandplains and ironstone hills between Merredin, Coolgardie and Menzies in the Coolgardie and Murchison bioregions of inland Western Australia.

See also
 List of Grevillea species

References

oligomera
Proteales of Australia
Eudicots of Western Australia
Taxa named by Donald McGillivray
Plants described in 1986